Achromadora is a genus of nematodes belonging to the family Achromadoridae.

The genus has almost cosmopolitan distribution.

Species:

Achromadora arenicola 
Achromadora buikensis 
Achromadora chungsani 
Achromadora dubia 
Achromadora gracilis 
Achromadora granulata 
Achromadora indica 
Achromadora inermis 
Achromadora inflata 
Achromadora longicauda 
Achromadora longiseta 
Achromadora micoletzkyi 
Achromadora micoleztkyi 
Achromadora papuana 
Achromadora pseudomicoletzky 
Achromadora pseudomicoletzkyi 
Achromadora ruricola 
Achromadora sedata 
Achromadora semiarmata 
Achromadora subdubia 
Achromadora tenax 
Achromadora tenera 
Achromadora terricola 
Achromadora thermophila 
Achromadora walkeri

References

Nematodes